Popović or Popovich or Popovitch is a common Serbian, Russian, Montenegrin, Bosnian, Romanian, Croatian, Ukrainian and Belarusian surname, and sometimes a patronymic meaning son of a priest.

Geographical distribution
As of 2014, the frequency of the surname Popović was highest in Montenegro (1: 68), followed by Serbia (1: 145), Bosnia and Herzegovina (1: 354), Croatia (1: 690), Slovenia (1: 1,485) and North Macedonia (1: 2,066).

The frequency of the surname Popovich was highest in Ukraine (1: 1,530), followed by Moldova (1: 4,735), Belarus (1: 9,762) and Russia (1: 10,762).

People with the surname

 Aleksandar Popović (disambiguation), multiple people
 Ana Popović, Serbian blues musician
 Andrija Popović, former Montenegrin waterpolo player, Member of Montenegrin Parliament
 Alyosha Popovich, a bogatyr (i.e., a medieval Russian knight-errant)
 Barbara Popović, Macedonian singer
 Bogdan Popović, Serbian literary critic and historian. Brother of Pavle Popović, also a literary critic
 Bojan Popović, Serbian basketball player
 Bojana Popović, Montenegrin handball player
 Boris Popovich, a Russian international footballer
 Constantin Popovici, a Romanian platform diver
 Cvjetko Popović, member of Mlada Bosna
 Daniel (Montenegrin singer), Croatian singer Danijel Popović
 Davorin Popović, singer, longtime frontman of Indexi
 Derek Popovich (born 1981), American soccer player
 Dimitrije Popović, Croatian painter
 Dušan Popović (disambiguation), several people
 Evgenije Popović, Montenegrin politician, writer and diplomat
 Greg Popovich, American business executive
 Gregg Popovich (born 1949), American basketball coach
 Hristina Popović  (born 1982), Serbian actress
 Ioan Popovici-Bănățeanul, an Austro-Hungarian-born Romanian prose writer and poet
 Janko Popović Volarić (born 1980), Croatian actor
 Joško Popović, Croatian national football team player
 Jovan Sterija Popović, Serbian playwright
 Justin Popović, Christian Orthodox theologian
 Koča Popović, Serbian communist politician
 Krsto Zrnov Popović, Montenegrin captain
 Lazar Popović, Serbian football player
 Leona Popović, Croatian alpine ski racer
 Ljuba Popović, Serbian surrealist painter
 Marina Popovich, a Soviet test pilot, Pavel Popovich's wife
 Marko Popović (born 1982), Croatian basketball player
 Mark Popovic, Canadian hockey player of Serbian descent
 Marko Popović (disambiguation),
 Marko Miljanov Popović, Montenegrin writer
 Mića Popović, Serbian painter
 Mihai Popovici, an Austro-Hungarian-born Romanian politician
 Danijel (singer), Montenegrin singer Milan Popović
 Milan Popović (disambiguation), several people
 Milentije Popović, Serbian communist politician
 Milt Popovich, American former National Football League player
 Mina Popović, Serbian national volleyball team player
 Miodrag Popović, Serbian actor
 Nebojša Popović, Serbian basketball player, coach and administrator
 Oliver Popović, Serbian basketball player and coach
 Paul Popovich, former Major League Baseball player
 Paul Popowich, Canadian actor
 Pavle Popović, Serbian literary critic and historian
 Pavel Popovich, Soviet cosmonaut
 Petar Popović (Croatian basketballer)
 Petar Popović (Serbian basketballer)
 Peter Popovic, Swedish ice hockey defenceman
 Peter S. Popovich, American lawyer, politician, and judge
 Sasha Montenegro, Montenegrin-Mexican actress born Alexandra Asimović Popović
 Sanja Popović, Croatian volleyball player 
 Silvija Popović, Serbian national volleyball player
 Srđa Popović (activist), Serbian activist of Otpor!
 Srđa Popović (lawyer), Yugoslav and Serbian civil rights lawyer and activist
 Tiberiu Popoviciu, Romanian mathematician
 Tony Popovic, Australian football (soccer) coach of Croatian descent
 Vasilije Popović (disambiguation), multiple people
 Vladica Popović, Serbian football player
 Vladimir Popović (disambiguation), multiple people
 Yaroslav Popovych, Ukrainian professional cyclist

See also
 Popowicz
 Popov
 Popovici
 Popovitsa

References

Occupational surnames
Serbian surnames
Montenegrin surnames
Russian-language surnames
Croatian surnames